Alfonso Lincoln Ribeiro (born September 21, 1971) is an American actor, comedian and television host. He is best known for his roles as Alfonso Spears on the sitcom Silver Spoons, Carlton Banks on the NBC sitcom The Fresh Prince of Bel-Air, and Maxwell Stanton on In the House.

He is the current host of ABC's America's Funniest Home Videos, replacing Tom Bergeron, who left after 15 years. Ribeiro has hosted the GSN game show Catch 21, the ABC Family show Spell-Mageddon, and the television show Dance 360. He also starred in the title role of the Broadway musical The Tap Dance Kid and took part in the 13th season of the British reality show I'm a Celebrity...Get Me Out of Here! Ribeiro won Season 19 of Dancing with the Stars with professional partner Witney Carson, then later became the co-host alongside Tyra Banks starting from Season 31.

Early life
Ribeiro was born in New York City in the Riverdale neighborhood of The Bronx to Afro-Trinidadian parents. His paternal grandfather was Albert Ribeiro, a Trinidadian calypsonian of African and Portuguese descent, known professionally as Lord Hummingbird.

Career

Early work
Ribeiro began his career at age 8. He first gained recognition in 1983 when he played a leading role in the Broadway musical The Tap Dance Kid. He received positive reviews for his performance and was nominated for an Outer Critics Circle Award. Ribeiro appeared as a dancer in a Pepsi commercial that featured Michael Jackson in 1984; a rumor spread that Ribeiro died from snapping his neck while dancing in the commercial. The same year, Ribeiro was cast as Rick Schroder's best friend on the TV series Silver Spoons.

In 1985, Ribeiro appeared as himself in a commercial on MTV, advertising a dance instruction book he authored, Alfonso's Breakin' & Poppin' Book. He also released four 12-inch singles on Prism Records, including the 1984 track, "Dance Baby".

The Fresh Prince of Bel-Air 
Ribeiro's most prominent role was as Carlton Banks, the cousin of Will Smith's lead character, on the NBC sitcom The Fresh Prince of Bel-Air from September 1990 to May 1996. Carlton was known for frequently dancing to Tom Jones' "It's Not Unusual", a dance routine that gained fame as "The Carlton".

Later work 
He later starred on the sitcom In the House with LL Cool J from 1997 to 1999.

Ribeiro competed as one of the celebrity singers on the reality television show Celebrity Duets in September 2006, winning over the runner-up Lucy Lawless. In July 2008, Ribeiro hosted the game show Catch 21 on GSN. He directed some episodes of Meet the Browns and a majority of the Season 2 episodes of the Are We There Yet? television series. Ribeiro hosted his second game show Spell-Mageddon, on ABC Family, in 2013.

On May 24, 2013, Ribeiro made a cameo appearance on The Graham Norton Show to perform "The Carlton Dance", with show guests Will and Jaden Smith. In November of that year, Ribeiro took part as a contestant in the thirteenth series of the British reality show, I'm a Celebrity...Get Me Out of Here. He was eliminated from the show on December 5, 2013, finishing in seventh place.

On September 4, 2014, Ribeiro was announced as one of the celebrities who would compete on Season 19 of Dancing with the Stars. He partnered with professional dancer Witney Carson. He became the fourth celebrity dancer in the show's history to receive a 9 from each judge in week one. On November 25, 2014, Ribeiro and Carson won the competition. In September 2015, he returned as a guest judge in week three of Season 21, and he substituted for Tom Bergeron as host the following week. In Season 31, he became a co-host of the show, alongside current host Tyra Banks.

On May 19, 2015, Ribeiro was named Bergeron's successor to host America's Funniest Home Videos. In July 2015, Ribeiro made a cameo appearance in the music video for "All Night" by pop-rock band R5.

In October 2018, he was announced as the host of the UK game show Money Tree. On October 12, 2018, Ribeiro was announced to sit in for Bruno Tonioli as guest judge on Strictly Come Dancing for week 5. He joined regular judges Craig Revel Horwood, Darcey Bussell, and Shirley Ballas. This also occurred for week 5 of the 2019 series. He also appeared as a contestant on a special Child TV Stars episode of Weakest Link in 2001. He made it into the final round but lost to Keshia Knight-Pulliam.

Catch 21 was revived in 2019, and Ribeiro returned as the host.  His role earned him a 2020 Daytime Emmy nomination for Outstanding Game Show Host, but he lost to Alex Trebek.  He earned another nomination the following year, but again lost to Trebek.

In 2020, Ribeiro starred in a series of commercials for State Farm Insurance as a fanatic of Chris Paul. In 2021, Ribeiro voiced a character in Muppets Haunted Mansion.

The 90s with Alfonso Ribeiro 
On July 6, 2019, the syndicated radio show The 90s with Alfonso Ribeiro launched on multiple radio stations across the country via Sun Broadcast Group. Radio veteran Daena "DK" Kramer joined him as co-host. The three-hour weekly show celebrates 1990s music and culture while Alfonso and DK share their stories, pop culture facts and  memories from the 1990s.

Personal life

Family 
Ribeiro was married to Robin Stapler from January 2002 until August 2006. They have a daughter, born in October 2002.

Ribeiro married Angela Unkrich on October 13, 2012, following a three-month engagement. The two live in Los Angeles and have three children born in 2013, 2015, and 2019.

Motorsports 
Ribeiro competed in several editions of the Toyota Pro/Celebrity Race car race at Long Beach, earning an overall win in 2015 and celebrity class wins in 1994, 1995 and 2016. He also worked as radio spotter for CART racecar driver Bryan Herta, and performed the national anthem at CART and IndyCar Series races.

Lawsuit against Epic Games 
In December 2018, Ribeiro, along with Instagram star Russell Horning, aka Backpack Kid, and rapper Terrence Ferguson, aka 2 Milly, brought a lawsuit against Epic Games for their decision to feature respective choreographies in the popular game Fortnite. In Ribeiro's case, his "Carlton dance", which he made popular in the 1990s as a cast member of The Fresh Prince of Bel-Air, is one of the many dances that Fortnite players can purchase for their avatars. Epic Games declined to comment on the lawsuits. The U.S. Copyright Office denied him a copyright for his dance on January 13, 2019. On March 7, 2019, Ribeiro dropped the lawsuit.

Filmography

Acting

Directing

Dancing with the Stars performances
Ribeiro was partnered with Witney Carson for season 19. On November 25, 2014, Ribeiro and Carson were declared the season's champions.

In November 2017, Ribeiro returned to 25th season in Week eight, to participate in a trio Jive with Frankie Muniz and his professional partner Witney Carson.

1 Score given by guest judge Kevin Hart in place of Goodman.

2The American public scored the dance in place of Goodman with the averaged score being counted alongside the three other judges.

3This week only, for "Partner Switch-Up" week, Ribeiro performed with Cheryl Burke instead of Carson.

4Score given by guest judge Jessie J in place of Goodman.

5Score given by guest judge Pitbull in place of Goodman.

References

External links
  
 Alfonso Ribeiro at Yahoo! Movies
 

1971 births
Living people
20th-century American male actors
21st-century American male actors
American game show hosts
American male child actors
American male dancers
American male musical theatre actors
American male television actors
American male voice actors
American people of Portuguese descent
American people of Trinidad and Tobago descent
American tap dancers
California State University, Los Angeles alumni
Dancing with the Stars (American TV series) winners
Entertainers from the Bronx
I'm a Celebrity...Get Me Out of Here! (British TV series) participants
Male actors from New York (state)
Male actors from New York City
Musicians from the Bronx
People from Riverdale, Bronx